William Perrett Mead (7 December 1889 – 5 August 1980) was a New Zealand engineer, skier, tramper, ranger and writer. He was born in Scarrotts Station, Northland, New Zealand on 7 December 1889.

References

1889 births
1980 deaths
20th-century New Zealand writers
20th-century New Zealand male writers
20th-century New Zealand engineers